HMS Seaford was purchased from Richard Herring of Bursledon. Richard Herring had built this vessel on speculation to a similar specification as the Maidstone Group. After she was commissioned she sailed as part of the expedition to recapture Fort York on Hudson Bay. She was also part of Symond's squadron in the West Indies where she was captured and burnt by the French in 1697.

Seaford was the first named ship tin the Royal Navy.

Construction
She was purchased from Richard Herring of Bursledon for 1,688.18.2d per ship with another £2,513. The tonnage calculation would be . her gun armament would be twenty-four sakers mounted on wooden trucks located on the upper deck (UD) with a further four 3-pounders mounted on wooden trucks on the quarterdeck (QD). A saker or sacar was a muzzle loading smooth bore gun of 1,400 pounds in weight with a 31/2 inch bore firing a 51/2 pound shot with a 51/2 pound powder charge.

Commissioned Service
She was commissioned in late 1695 under the command of Captain John Grange, RN. She was part of the 1696 Hudson Bay expedition to recapture Fort York at the mouth of the Nelson River. Captain Grange died in August 1696 with Captain John Watkins, RN assuming command on the 14th. On 19 January 1697 Captain George Walton, RN took command and sailed with Symond's squadron to the West Indies in April 1697.

Disposition
HMS Seaford was taken by a French squadron off the Isles of Scilly on 5 May 1697 and burnt.

Notes

Citations

References
 Winfield, British Warships in the Age of Sail (1603 – 1714), by Rif Winfield, published by Seaforth Publishing, England © 2009, EPUB , Chapter 6, The Sixth Rates, Vessels acquired from 18 December 1688, Sixth Rates of 20 guns and up to 26 guns, Purchased Vessel (1695), Seaford
 Colledge, Ships of the Royal Navy, by J.J. Colledge, revised and updated by Lt Cdr Ben Warlow and Steve Bush, published by Seaforth Publishing, Barnsley, Great Britain, © 2020, e  (EPUB), Section S (Seaford)

 

Corvettes of the Royal Navy
Naval ships of the United Kingdom